Merosargus rotundatus is a species of soldier fly in the family Stratiomyidae.

Distribution
Costa Rica, Panama.

References

Stratiomyidae
Insects described in 1932
Diptera of North America
Taxa named by Charles Howard Curran
Fauna of Panama